Thirteen Blue Magic Lane is the third album by American soul group Blue Magic, produced by Norman Harris and Ron "Have Mercy" Kersey and released in 1975 on the Atco label.

History
The album was recorded at Sigma Sound Studios in Philadelphia and features Sigma's famous house band MFSB.  Thirteen Blue Magic Lane is the third of Blue Magic's highly regarded triumvirate of classic Philadelphia soul albums of 1974-1975, admired for its mixture of equally strong ballads and uptempo tracks.  "Chasing Rainbows" and "The Loneliest House on the Block" are ballads in the style for which the group had become known, while tracks such as "We're on the Right Track" are seen as being at what was at the time the cutting edge in the development of disco music out of established soul music forms.  "What's Come Over Me" is a remake of a track from the group's first album Blue Magic, featuring vocalist Margie Joseph.

Track listing

Personnel
Blue Magic
Vernon Sawyer, Wendell Sawyer, Richard Pratt, Ted Mills, Keith Beaton – vocals

Musicians
Bobby Eli, Norman Harris, Roland Chambers – guitars
Ron Kersey, Cotton Kent, Dexter Wansel, Ted Mills – keyboards
Vince Montana – vibraphone
Ronald Baker, Michael Foreman, Rusty Jackmon, Larry LaBes – bass
Earl Young, Charles Collins, – drums
Larry Washington, Robert Cupit, Bunny Harris – percussion
Don Renaldo and his Strings and Horns – strings & horns accompaniment

Production
Norman Harris, Ron "Have Mercy" Kersey – producers, arrangement
Alan Rubens, Steven Bernstein, Bruce Gable – executive producers
Carl Paruolo, Kenny Present, Jay Mark – recording engineers
Dirk Devlin, Mike Huchinson, James Gallagher – assistant engineers
Nimitr Sarikananda, Wayne Wilfong – mastering
Richard Rome – arrangement
Ted "Wizard" Mills – rhythm arrangement

Charts

Singles

References

External links
 

1975 albums
Blue Magic (band) albums
Albums produced by Norman Harris
Albums recorded at Sigma Sound Studios
Atco Records albums